The 1989 All-SEC football team consists of American football players selected to the All-Southeastern Conference (SEC) chosen by various selectors for the 1989 NCAA Division I-A football season.

Offensive selections

Receivers
Tony Moss, LSU (AP-1, UPI)

Tight ends 
 Lamonde Russell, Alabama (AP-1, UPI)

Tackles
Mike Pfeifer, Kentucky (AP-1, UPI)
Terril Chatman, Alabama (AP-1, UPI)

Guards 
Ed King, Auburn (AP-1, UPI)
Eric Still, Tennessee (AP-1, UPI)

Centers 
Roger Shultz, Alabama (AP-1, UPI)

Quarterbacks 

 Gary Hollingsworth, Alabama (AP-1)
Tommy Hodson, LSU (UPI)

Running backs 

 Siran Stacy, Alabama (AP-1, UPI)
Emmitt Smith, Florida (College Football Hall of Fame) (AP-1, UPI)
Chuck Webb, Tennessee (AP-1)
Rodney Hampton, Georgia (UPI)

Defensive selections

Ends
Marion Hobby, Tennessee (AP-1 [as OLB], UPI)
Tony Bennett, Ole Miss (UPI)

Tackles 
Oliver Barnett, Kentucky (AP-1, UPI)
David Rocker, Auburn (AP-1, UPI)
Bill Goldberg, Georgia (AP-1)

Middle guards
Willie Wyatt, Alabama (AP-1, UPI)

Linebackers 
 Keith McCants, Alabama (AP-1, UPI)
Craig Ogletree, Auburn (AP-1)
Quentin Riggins, Auburn (AP-1)
Huey Richardson, Florida (UPI)
DeMond Winston, Vanderbilt (UPI)

Backs 
Ben Smith, Georgia (AP-1, UPI)
John Mangum, Alabama (AP-1, UPI)
Efram Thomas, Alabama (AP-1)
Richard Fain, Florida (AP-1)
John Wiley, Auburn (UPI)

Special teams

Kicker 
Philip Doyle, Alabama (AP-1)
David Browndyke, LSU (UPI)

Punter 

 Kent Elmore, Tennessee (UPI)

Key
AP = Associated Press

UPI = United Press International

Bold = Consensus first-team selection by both AP and UPI

See also
1989 College Football All-America Team

References

All-SEC
All-SEC football teams